Twaddell may refer to:

People
 William J. Twaddell (1884–1922), assassinated Irish politician
 William Freeman Twaddell (1906–1982), American linguist
 William H. Twaddell, American diplomat

Other
 Twaddell scale, a hydrometer scale for reporting the measured specific gravity of a liquid relative to water

See also
Twaddle, a variant on the surname Twaddell